BeamNG.drive is a vehicle simulation video game developed and published by Bremen-based video game developer BeamNG GmbH. The game features soft-body physics, which simulates realistic handling and damage to vehicles. The game was initially released as a tech demo on 3 August 2013 along with paid access to an alpha, and was made available on Steam Early Access for Microsoft Windows on 29 May 2015.

Gameplay 
BeamNG.drive features various gameplay modes and scenarios such as campaigns and a time trial mode, aside from free mode. Campaigns are collections of small scenarios on specific themes (races, chases, stunts, etc...), whereas in time trials, the player selects a vehicle, a level, a route, and competes against their own best time. In free roam, players can explore and experiment with levels, allowing them to operate, place, and manipulate objects and vehicles within the level, but also change environmental properties such as gravity and wind. Players can utilize various objects ranging from road barriers to weapons like cannons, to inflict damage on their vehicles.

As of alpha release 0.26, the game features an experimental version of a career mode accessed by clicking the main menu button labeled "Career (coming soon)" six times. This gameplay mode features four career branches: Motorsports, Labourer, Specialized, and Adventurer. Completing missions awards the player in-game currency and two types of experience points: Branch EXP, which is experience points gained within specific branches, and Beam EXP, the overall amount of experience points. The mode's currency does not currently have a use.

Physics 

BeamNG.drive uses soft-body physics to simulate vehicle dynamics and collisions between objects and other vehicles.  Algorithms have been written for the physics equations to be carried out. It relies heavily on coding in Lua, and uses packets of local data using the Lua network system while the game is running. The game's engine constantly calculates physics equations and problems in real-time during gameplay.

Vehicles in the game consist of a soft-body node-beam structure similar to those in Rigs of Rods. The physics engine simulates a network of interconnected nodes and beams, which combine to form an invisible skeleton of a vehicle with realistic weights and masses. In terms of soft-body physics, vehicles realistically flex and deform as stresses to the skeleton, such as impacts from collisions, are applied. Aside from body deformation, various other types of damage are simulated such as degraded engine, detached doors and shattered windows. If a vehicle is severely damaged, the engine may fail, rendering the vehicle unusable; additionally, the vehicle will also fail from overloading the driveshaft, clutch, and other important components that can result in catastrophic failure to the vehicle. Also, tires can be blown out and fuel tanks may explode after an excessive amount of collisions or a direct hit on the rear of the vehicle.

Development 
In 2011, some Rigs of Rods developers gathered and decided to improve upon the open-source software with a new product. BeamNG opened its website, beamng.com, on 8 May 2012 to deliver news of the game's development. On 28 May 2012, BeamNG released a YouTube video entitled "Revolutionary soft-body physics in CryEngine3" that featured the vehicle deformation technology. The video, according to Marketing and Communications manager Nataliia Dmytriievska, got over one million views overnight. Originally, BeamNG.drive was to be based on CryEngine 3, but its use in a driving game uncovered numerous bugs, leading development to be rolled over to Torque 3D.

A free tech demo was released on 3 August 2013 along with paid access to an alpha test through FastSpring. The tech demo featured only one vehicle and one map, while the first available alpha release contained five vehicles and six maps. On 10 September 2013, BeamNG’s sixth car, Bruckell Moonhawk, was released with YouTube premiere.  The game was placed on an open vote on Steam Greenlight on 12 February 2014 and was greenlit eight days later. On 29 May 2015, the game was released to Steam Early Access.

On 15 June 2018, BeamNG announced a partnership with Camshaft Software, Developers of Automation, revealing the addition of an exporter feature that allows players to export vehicles made within Automation as fully driveable vehicles in BeamNG.drive.

On 25 April 2022, BeamNG announced they were ceasing development of the 32-bit branch as of alpha release 0.25. They stated that less than 0.5% of players were using the 32-bit version and that the decision will speed up the game's development and allow the developers to take full advantage of newer technologies.

Reception 
Jack Stewart of BBC mentioned that BeamNG.drive "has received interest from the film industry to model vehicle stunts so that they can be prototyped and tested exhaustively – but cheaply – before a stunt driver smashes up a car on set." Polygon's Nick Robinson lauded the game's simulated physics and user-created content support, leading him to create a 38-episode video series for Polygon, "Car Boys", in which he and Griffin McElroy spotlighted new BeamNG.drive content each week. Automobile magazine praised the game for its diverse selection of vehicles and its realistic crash physics, saying that "the IIHS has nothing on BeamNG.drive." As of January 2023 BeamNG.Drive was ranked 30th on the list of the highest-rated Steam games.

References

External links 
 

Driving simulators
Early access video games
Lua (programming language)-scripted video games
Steam Greenlight games
Torque (game engine) games
Upcoming video games
Windows games
Windows-only games
Video games developed in Germany